A number of steamships have been named Günther, including:

 , a cargo ship in service 1907–1917
 , a Hansa A Type cargo ship in service 1944–45

Ship names